Halla Bol! Kids TV is a Canadian Category B-exempt Hindi language specialty channel owned by Channel Zero. Halla Bol! Kids TV broadcasts programming primarily aimed at children in addition to select family-oriented programming.

History

On January 9, 2012, FDR Media Group was given approval by the Canadian Radio-television and Telecommunications Commission (CRTC) to launch a specialty channel named "Hindi Children Channel", described as "a national, niche third-language ethnic Category 21 specialty programming undertaking that would consist of programs focussing on South Asian culture and entertainment catering to Canadian children of South Asian ethnicity from 3 to 10 years of age." Later that month, the channel was officially named Halla Bol! Kids TV.

At an undisclosed point, FDR's broadcast licenses were acquired by Channel Zero. Halla Bol! Kids TV debuted exclusively on Bell Fibe on January 16, 2014. On August 4, 2014, the channel launched in the United States through Dish Network and Sling TV. It was later made available on Rogers Cable and Telus Optik TV.

At the request of Channel Zero, the CRTC revoked the channel's Canadian broadcast license on February 21, 2018. The company continues to operate the channel under exempt status.

References

External links
Official website

Digital cable television networks in Canada
Channel Zero (company)
Children's television networks in Canada
Children's television networks in the United States
Defunct television networks in Canada
Television channels and stations established in 2014
2014 establishments in Canada
Hindi-language television in Canada